Renée Elliott (born 1964) is an American businesswoman, founder of Planet Organic, and co-founder of Beluga Bean.

Early life
Elliott was born in Pascagoula, Mississippi, and grew up outside of Boston, Massachusetts. At UMASS Lowell, she studied English and minored in health.

Career
During a personal development course in Boston in 1991, Elliott was inspired by visits to different organic stores on her lunch breaks, including Bread & Circus. She felt that there was an opportunity in the UK's organic food market segment and that she wanted to open her own stores in London. Elliott founded Planet Organic, the UK's first organic supermarket, in London in 1995.

In 2017, Elliott founded her second business, Beluga Bean, with Sam Wigan. The company is a wellbeing enterprise pioneering new strategies for success in business and life.

In 2018, Elliott sold a stake of Planet Organic to Inverleith, a Scottish private equity firm in a deal estimated at around $15 million.

Additional affiliations
Elliott serves on the Soil Association's catering mark standards committee, the Seven Hills Advisory Board for Purpose, the advisory board for Love Ocean, and as a non-executive director for NEMI Teas, a social enterprise.

Publications
 The Top 100 Health Recipes for Babies & Toddlers (2010)
 Me You & the Kids, Too (2012)
 What to Eat & How to Eat It (2017)

References

External links
 Beluga Bean website

American women in business
1965 births
Living people
American company founders
American women company founders
People from Pascagoula, Mississippi
American cookbook writers
American expatriates in England
21st-century American women